James J. Baldwin, Jr. (born July 15, 1971) is an American former professional baseball pitcher with the Chicago White Sox, Los Angeles Dodgers, Seattle Mariners, Minnesota Twins, New York Mets, Texas Rangers and Baltimore Orioles of Major League Baseball (MLB). Baldwin batted and threw right-handed.

Career

Playing career
Drafted by the Chicago White Sox in the fourth round of the 1990 MLB draft, Baldwin made his MLB debut on April 30, 1995, for the White Sox.  In spring training of that same season, Baldwin was the first pitcher to face Michael Jordan, in an intrasquad game in spring training. In , Baldwin made the Major League Baseball All-Star Game as a member of the White Sox. He pitched the third inning of that game, giving up Chipper Jones' second hit of the game, that being the only home run of the night, which ignited a short-lived National League comeback.  On January 24, Baldwin signed a minor league contract with the Toronto Blue Jays, but was released on April 22.

Coaching career
Baldwin served as the pitching coach for the baseball team at Pinecrest High School in Southern Pines, North Carolina. He joined the Cincinnati Reds organization and served as a rehabilitation coach at their Arizona complex from 2016 through 2019. He was named the pitching coach for the Louisville Bats prior to the 2020 season.

Family
His son, James Baldwin III, a center fielder from Pinecrest High School, was drafted in the fourth round and signed in 2010 by the Los Angeles Dodgers.

References

External links

1971 births
Living people
African-American baseball coaches
African-American baseball players
American expatriate baseball players in Canada
American League All-Stars
Baltimore Orioles players
Baseball coaches from North Carolina
Baseball players from North Carolina
Birmingham Barons players
Charlotte Knights players
Chicago White Sox players
Gulf Coast White Sox players
High school baseball coaches in the United States
Los Angeles Dodgers players
Major League Baseball pitchers
Minnesota Twins players
Minor league baseball coaches
Nashville Sounds players
New York Mets players
Norfolk Tides players
Omaha Royals players
Ottawa Lynx players
People from Southern Pines, North Carolina
Rochester Red Wings players
Sarasota White Sox players
Seattle Mariners players
South Bend White Sox players
Syracuse SkyChiefs players
Texas Rangers players
Toledo Mud Hens players
Utica Blue Sox players
21st-century African-American sportspeople
20th-century African-American sportspeople